The canton of Saint-Paul-des-Landes is an administrative division of the Cantal department, southern France. It was created at the French canton reorganisation which came into effect in March 2015. Its seat is in Saint-Paul-des-Landes.

It consists of the following communes:
 
Arnac
Ayrens
Cayrols
Cros-de-Montvert
Glénat
Lacapelle-Viescamp
Laroquebrou
Montvert
Nieudan
Omps
Parlan
Rouffiac
Le Rouget-Pers
Roumégoux
Saint-Étienne-Cantalès
Saint-Gérons
Saint-Paul-des-Landes
Saint-Santin-Cantalès
Saint-Saury
Saint-Victor
La Ségalassière
Siran

References

Cantons of Cantal